Naregal is a panchayat town in Gadag district in the Indian state of Karnataka. It is about 27 kilometers from Gajendragad and 28 kilometers from Gadag.

Culture

Dravidian temple 
Padmabbarasi basadi has a shikhara of Dravida vimana type over the garbhagriha. It is a trikuta. Its main garbhagriha was meant for a Jina, and is square. The other two garbhagriha are rectangular, and have rectangular pedestals from wall to wall with twenty-four holes indicating that both of them were meant for establishing 24 Tirthankara sculptures. This became common in the 11th century.

Narayana temple 
Narayana temple at Naregal was built during the period of Krishna III, by Padmabbarasi, the queen of Ganga Permadi Bhutayya in 950 AD. It is the biggest Rashtrakuta temple in Karnataka.

Education
Government and private schools offer primary, secondary and college educations.

Demographics
 India census, Naregal had a population of 16,652. Males constitute 51% and females 49%. Naregal has an average literacy rate of 61%, higher than the national average of 59.5%: male literacy is 73%, and female literacy is 49%. 13% of the population is under 6 years of age.

Transport
Naregal is well connected by road. A state highway connects to Gadag and Kushtagi. The nearest railway station is Gadag.

See also
Kotumachagi
Gajendragad
Ron
Gadag
Karnataka

References

Cities and towns in Gadag district